Chico Buarque is an album by Brazilian composer, singer and musician Chico Buarque released on June 20, 2011.

Track listing
 "Querido Diário"
 "C. Buarque"
 "Rubato"
 "C. Buarque, Helder"
 "Essa pequena"
 "C. Buarque"
 "Tipo um baião"
 "C. Buarque"
 "Se eu soubesse (with Thais Gulin)"
 "C. Buarque"
 "Sem você nº 2
 C. Buarque"
 "Sou eu (with Wilson das Neves)"
 "C. Buarque, I. Lins"
 "Nina"
 "C. Buarque"
 "Barafunda"
 "C. Buarque"
 "Sinhá (with João Bosco)"
 "C. Buarque, J. Bosco"

References

2011 albums
Chico Buarque albums